Jeļena Rubļevska (born 23 March 1976) is a Latvian modern pentathlete. She won a silver medal at the 2004 Summer Olympics in Athens, Greece, becoming the first woman representing Latvia to win an Olympic medal.

Her score of 5380 at the 2004 Olympics consisted of:

 Shooting—988
 Fencing—1028
 Swimming—1160
 Riding—1116
 Running—1088

Rubļevska has competed in the modern pentathlon at four Olympic games: 2000, 2004, 2008, and 2012.

Her daughter Ieva Maļuka is a Latvian swimmer.

References

External links
 
 
 
 
 
 

1976 births
Living people
Sportspeople from Riga
Latvian female modern pentathletes
Olympic modern pentathletes of Latvia
Modern pentathletes at the 2000 Summer Olympics
Modern pentathletes at the 2004 Summer Olympics
Modern pentathletes at the 2008 Summer Olympics
Modern pentathletes at the 2012 Summer Olympics
Olympic silver medalists for Latvia
Olympic medalists in modern pentathlon
World Modern Pentathlon Championships medalists
Medalists at the 2004 Summer Olympics
Latvian Academy of Sport Education alumni
Latvian people of Russian descent